Stagmatopterinae was a subfamily of the Mantidae, a family of insects within the order of mantises (Mantodea).  Many of the genera have now been placed in the subfamily Vatinae.

Genera

The Stagmatopterinae subfamily consisted of 6 genera, and 50 species.
Catoxyopsis
Catoxyopsis dubiosa
Lobocneme
Lobocneme colombiae
Lobocneme icterica Saussure & Zehntner, 1894 (synonym Paroxyopsis icterica)
Lobocneme lobipes
Oxyopsis
Oxyopsis acutipennis
Oxyopsis festae
Oxyopsis gracilis (South American green mantis)
Oxyopsis lobeter
Oxyopsis media
Oxyopsis obtusa
Oxyopsis oculea
Oxyopsis peruviana (Peruvian mantis)
Oxyopsis rubicunda
Oxyopsis saussurei
Oxyopsis stali
Parastagmatoptera
Parastagmatoptera amazonica
Parastagmatoptera concolor
Parastagmatoptera confusa
Parastagmatoptera flavoguttata (synonym = Parastagmatoptera abnormis)
Parastagmatoptera glauca
Parastagmatoptera hoorie
Parastagmatoptera immaculata
Parastagmatoptera pellucida
Parastagmatoptera serricornis
Parastagmatoptera simulacrum
Parastagmatoptera tessellata
Parastagmatoptera unipunctata
Parastagmatoptera vitreola
Parastagmatoptera vitrepennis
Parastagmatoptera zernyi
Pseudoxyops
Pseudoxyops boliviana
Pseudoxyops borellii
Pseudoxyops diluta
Pseudoxyops minuta
Pseudoxyops perpulchra
Stagmatoptera
Stagmatoptera abdominalis
Stagmatoptera binotata
Stagmatoptera biocellata
Stagmatoptera femoralis
Stagmatoptera flavipennis
Stagmatoptera hyaloptera (Argentine white crested mantis )
Stagmatoptera luna
Stagmatoptera nova
Stagmatoptera pia
Stagmatoptera praecaria
Stagmatoptera reimoseri
Stagmatoptera septentrionalis
Stagmatoptera supplicaria
Stagmatoptera vischeri

See also
List of mantis genera and species

References

 
Mantidae
Mantodea subfamilies